Gordillo is a surname. Notable people with the surname include:

Elba Esther Gordillo (born 1945), Mexican politician, affiliated to the Institutional Revolutionary Party until 2006
Gabriel París Gordillo (1910–2008), President of Colombia from May 1957 to August 1958
John Gordillo, Perrier Award-nominated English director and Comedian
Michel Gordillo, (born 1955), Spanish world record aviator
Mónica Arriola Gordillo (born 1971), Mexican politician affiliated to the New Alliance Party
Rafael Gordillo (born 1957), retired Spanish footballer